2-hydroxyacylsphingosine 1-beta-galactosyltransferase is an enzyme that in humans is encoded by the UGT8 gene.

Function 

Galactocerebrosides are abundant sphingolipids of the myelin membrane of the central nervous system and peripheral nervous system and are also present in small amounts in kidney. The key enzymatic step in the biosynthesis of galactocerebrosides consists of the transfer of galactose to ceramide catalyzed by UDP-galactose ceramide galactosyltransferase (CGT, EC 2.4.1.45). The enzyme encoded by the CGT gene is the first involved in complex lipid biosynthesis in the myelinating oligodendrocyte.

References

Further reading 

 
 
 
 
 
 
 
 
 

EC 2.4.1